Charltona tritonella is a moth in the family Crambidae. It was described by George Hampson in 1898. It is found in South Africa, where it has been recorded from KwaZulu-Natal and Mpumalanga.

References

Endemic moths of South Africa
Crambinae
Moths described in 1898
Taxa named by George Hampson